Northern Min is a group of mutually intelligible Min varieties spoken in Nanping prefecture of northwestern Fujian.

Classification and distribution 
Early classifications of varieties of Chinese, such as those of Li Fang-Kuei in 1937 and Yuan Jiahua in 1960, divided Min into Northern and Southern subgroups.
However, in a 1963 report on a survey of Fujian, Pan Maoding and colleagues argued that the primary split was between inland and coastal groups.
In a reclassification that has been followed by most dialectologists since, they restricted the term Northern Min to inland dialects of Nanping prefecture, and classified the coastal dialects of Fuzhou and Ningde as Eastern Min.

According to the Language Atlas of China, Northern Min varieties are spoken throughout the counties of Wuyishan (formerly Chong'an), Jianyang, Jian'ou, Zhenghe and Songxi, in the southern part of Pucheng County and the northeastern part of Shunchang County, and in Yanping District except for the Nanping dialect of the urban area of Nanping, which is an island of an isolated Mandarin dialect of uncertain affinity.
The Jianyang and Jian'ou dialects are often taken as representative.

Although coastal Min varieties can be derived from a proto-language with four series of stop or affricate initials at each point of articulation (e.g.
In Northern Min dialects, these initials have a different tonal development from other stops and affricates, though the details vary between varieties.
Moreover, although in Jian'ou and Zhenghe these initials yield voiceless unaspirated initials (as in coastal varieties), they yield voiced sonorants or the zero initial in Jianyang and Wuyishan.
Because of these reflexes, Jerry Norman called these initials "softened" stops and affricates.

References

Further reading

Akitani, Hiroyuki 秋谷裕幸. 2008. Minbeiqu sanxianshi fangyan yanjiu 閩北區三縣市方言研究. Taipei: Academia Sinica.  (Documents three Northern Min dialects in detail: Shibei 石陂 of Pucheng County; Zhenqian 镇前 of Zhenghe County; Dikou 迪口 of Jian'ou City)
Fujian Normal University Research Institute 福建师范学院. n.d. Mindong, Bei fangyan diaocha ziliao huibian (part 1) 闽东、北方言调查资料汇编: 第1辑. Fujian Normal University Research Institute 福建师范学院, Dialectology group, Chinese language department 中文系语言教研组 方言调查小组.
Huang Chin-wen 黄金文. 2001. 方言接觸與閩北方言演變 / Language contact and the phonological changes in North Min. Taipei: National Taiwan University.
Ma Chongqi 馬重奇. 2014. 明清閩北方言韻書手抄本音系研究 / A phonological study of the manuscripts of Northern Fujian Dialect rhyme books in the Ming and Qing Dynasties. Beijing: Commercial Press. 
Pan Weishui 潘渭水. 2007. Minbei fangyan yanjiu 闽北方言研究. Fuzhou: Fujian Educational Press 福建教育出版社.